Yitzhak Englander (born 30 April 1946) is an Israeli former footballer. He competed in the men's tournament at the 1968 Summer Olympics.

References

External links
 
 
 

1946 births
Living people
Israeli footballers
Israel international footballers
Israeli people of Hungarian-Jewish descent
Olympic footballers of Israel
Footballers at the 1968 Summer Olympics
Footballers from Haifa
Hungarian emigrants to Israel
Association football midfielders
Hapoel Haifa F.C. players
Maccabi Haifa F.C. players
Liga Leumit players